Derek Ian Tennent Eastman (22 January 1919 – 7 January 1991) was a priest in the Church of England.

Eastman was educated at Winchester College, Christ Church, Oxford and Ripon College Cuddesdon. After World War II service with the Coldstream Guards he was ordained in 1948. Following a curacy at Brighouse he was priest in charge of St Andrew's Caversham. He held incumbencies at Headington and Banbury and was the Archdeacon of Buckingham from 1970 to 1977.

References

1919 births
1991 deaths
Alumni of Christ Church, Oxford
Coldstream Guards officers
Alumni of Ripon College Cuddesdon
Archdeacons of Buckingham